Gerardus Henricus "Puck" van Heel (21 January 1904 – 19 December 1984) was a Dutch footballer. He earned 64 caps for the Netherlands national football team, and played in the 1934 and 1938 World Cups. He also represented the Netherlands at the 1928 Summer Olympics. During his club career, he played for his home town club of Feyenoord. Normally an inside left and left wing half, Van Heel was a slow player but possessed considerable vision and technical ability and was particularly good passer.

He held the Dutch caps record from 4 April 1937 (when he equaled the total of Harry Dénis) until 22 May 1979 (when his total was surpassed by Ruud Krol).

Van Heel was born on the southside of Rotterdam, the fourth of eleven children, into a Roman Catholic family. His father worked in the shipyards of Rotterdam. He joined the amateur club Sportclub Feyenoord, a youth academy for Feyenoord Rotterdam, and made his amateur debut in the red and white on 12 October 1919.

Playing career
Van Heel was a cornerstone of the Feyenoord success preceding World War II, winning five Dutch Eredivisie Championships and two KNVB Cups. During his time there, he became the team captain and a figurehead for the club. He was also one of the 11 Feyenoord players, (Adri van Male, Pleun de Groot, Joop van der Heide, Bas Paauwe, Gerard Kuppen, van Heel, Jan Linssen, Piet Smits, Manus Vrauwdeunt, Leen Vente, Piet Kantebeen) chosen to play at the inauguration of their new stadium on 27 March 1937. The stadium was christened Feijenoord Stadion but would become known as "De Kuip". The game was against Belgian side Beerschot and watched by 37,825 spectators. Feyenoord were runaway victors with a final scoreline of 5–2.

Van Heel earned his first international cap at 21 years of age, on 19 April 1925. He would be part of the Dutch team for the next 13 years, until his retirement from international duty on 23 October 1938. His final game, a 2–2 draw with Denmark, would be his 64th cap for the Dutch national side. He equaled Harry Dénis's record of 56 caps on 4 April 1937 and would earn his 57th on 2 May 1937, both of these games were against Belgium. He would remain the most capped Dutch player until 1979 when Ruud Krol would exceed his total.

Van Heel played in the 1934 and 1938 FIFA World Cups under English manager Bob Glendenning.

Career honours

Club
Feyenoord
 Eredivisie: 1923–24, 1927–28, 1935–36, 1937–38, 1939–40; runner-up: 1930-31, 1931–32, 1932–33, 1936–37
 KNVB Cup: 1930, 1935; runner-up: 1934

References

1904 births
1984 deaths
Association football midfielders
Dutch footballers
Netherlands international footballers
Olympic footballers of the Netherlands
Footballers at the 1928 Summer Olympics
1934 FIFA World Cup players
1938 FIFA World Cup players
Feyenoord players
Footballers from Rotterdam
Dutch Roman Catholics